Biberbrugg railway station is a railway station in the Swiss canton of Schwyz and municipality of Feusisberg. It takes its name from the nearby village of Biberbrugg. The station is on the Pfäffikon SZ to Arth-Goldau line, and the Wädenswil to Einsiedeln railway line, which are owned by the Südostbahn. The two lines part company just to the south and east of the station.

Services 
The following services stop at Biberbrugg:

 Zürich S-Bahn:
 Lucerne S-Bahn : hourly service to Arth-Goldau.

References

External links 
 
 

Biberbrugg
Biberbrugg